Bagura may refer to:

Bogra, Bangladesh
Bagura, Rajshahi, Bangladesh